Talha Ülvan (born 20 April 2001), is a professional footballer who plays as a right-back for Giresunspor. Born in Belgium he is a youth international for Turkey.

Professional career
A youth product of the Belgian club Oud-Heverlee Leuven, Ülvan transferred to the TFF First League club Samsunspor on 8 January 2022. On 5 August 2022 after making a single senior appearance with Samsunspor, he transferred to the Turkish Süper Lig club Giresunspor. He made his professional debut win a 3–2 Süper Lig loss to Adana Demirspor on 7 August 2022.

Personal life
Born in Belgium, Ülvan is of Turkish descent. He is a youth international for Turkey, having played for the Turkey U19s.

References

External links
 

2001 births
Living people
Sportspeople from Hasselt
Footballers from Limburg (Belgium)
Turkish footballers
Turkey youth international footballers
Belgian footballers
Belgian people of Turkish descent
Samsunspor footballers
Giresunspor footballers
Süper Lig players
TFF First League players
Association football fullbacks